Cryptanthus lutherianus is a plant species in the genus Cryptanthus. This species is endemic to Brazil.

References

lutherianus
Flora of Brazil